Måns Saebbö (born 21 August 2000) is a Swedish footballer who plays for FC Trollhättan as a forward.

References

External links 
 

Swedish footballers
Sweden youth international footballers
Allsvenskan players
Superettan players
2000 births
Living people
IFK Göteborg players
GAIS players
FC Trollhättan players
Association football forwards